La bambolona (internationally released as Baby Doll and Big Baby Doll) is a 1968 Italian comedy film directed by Franco Giraldi. It is the Giraldi's fifth film after four successful spaghetti western and the first film in which he is credited with his real name and not as Frank Garfield.  The film also represents the first of the four collaborations between Giraldi and the screenwriter Ruggero Maccari. The film is based on the novel with the same name written by Alba De Céspedes.

For his role in this movie Ugo Tognazzi was awarded with a Nastro d'Argento for Best Actor. He later starred in two more movies directed by Giraldi, Cuori solitari and La supertestimone.

Cast 
Ugo Tognazzi as Giulio Broggini
 Isabella Rei as Ivana
 Corrado Sonni as Rosario, Ivana's father
Lilla Brignone as Adelina, Ivana's mother
 Marisa Bartoli as Luisa
Susy Andersen as Silvia
Margherita Guzzinati as Daria

References

External links

1968 films
Commedia all'italiana
Films set in Rome
Films directed by Franco Giraldi
Films scored by Luis Bacalov
Films with screenplays by Ruggero Maccari
1968 comedy films
1960s Italian films